Christopher John Dyke Acland (7 September 1966 – 17 October 1996) was an English drummer and songwriter. He was the drummer of the London-based alternative rock band Lush.

Early life
Acland was born at the Royal Lancaster Infirmary in Lancaster, Lancashire. He was the son of Oliver Geoffrey Dyke Acland and Judith Veronica Williams, and the great-grandson of Sir Francis Dyke Acland, the 14th Baronet Acland. He studied at North London Polytechnic, where he met his future Lush bandmates Meriel Barham and Miki Berenyi, briefly dating the latter.

Career
He played in a number of bands, including The Infection, Les Turds, A Touch of Hysteria and Panic, before founding Lush in 1988 with Steve Rippon, Emma Anderson, Meriel Barham and Miki Berenyi. After personnel changes gave way to a stable lineup, Lush released their debut mini album, Scar, and developed a following as a live act. They would go on to release three albums and several singles and EPs and achieve critical success.

Personal life and death
Acland was a keen football fan and a supporter of Tottenham Hotspur F.C. He and members of Moose and the Cocteau Twins formed the band The Lillies and recorded a humorous flexi-disc entitled "And David Seaman Will Be Very Disappointed About That" following the team's victory over North London rivals Arsenal in the 1991 FA Cup semi-finals

On 17 October 1996, Lush had completed their tour and music festival appearances. Two days after Anderson announced a desire to quit the band, Acland was found dead as a result of suicide by hanging in his parents' garden in Burneside, Cumbria. Devastated by the news, Acland's bandmates subsequently disbanded after a period of mourning.

References

1966 births
1996 deaths
Chris
Alumni of the University of North London
English rock drummers
People from Lancaster, Lancashire
Musicians from Lancashire
Suicides by hanging in England
20th-century English musicians
20th-century drummers
20th-century British male musicians
20th-century British musicians
Lush (band) members
1996 suicides